Eudore Allard (27 August 1915 – 17 September 2001) was a Social Credit Party member of the House of Commons of Canada. He was born in Carleton-sur-Mer, Quebec and became a sales representative and hotel operator by career.

He initially attempted to enter Parliament at the Matapédia—Matane electoral district in the 1962 and 1963 federal elections but was unsuccessful.

Allard won the Rimouski riding in the 1972 election and was re-elected there in the 1974 and 1979 elections. After serving terms in the 29th, 30th and 31st Canadian Parliaments, Allard was defeated in the 1980 election by Liberal party candidate Eva Côté.

His final attempt to re-enter Canadian Parliament was made at the Rimouski—Témiscouata riding in the 1988 federal election as an independent candidate.

External links
 

1915 births
2001 deaths
Members of the House of Commons of Canada from Quebec
People from Carleton-sur-Mer
Social Credit Party of Canada MPs